Junie Shoaf "Lefty" Barnes (December 1, 1911 – December 31, 1963) was a professional baseball pitcher who played in two games for the Cincinnati Reds in . He attended Wake Forest University. When Barnes played with the Reds in 1934, he was one of three players (Beryl Richmond and Sherman Edwards were the other two) who were not assigned a uniform number.

References

External links

1911 births
1963 deaths
Cincinnati Reds players
Major League Baseball pitchers
Baseball players from North Carolina
Concord Weavers players
Nashville Vols players
Mooresville Moors players